Manhattan is a 1924 American silent romantic adventure film directed by R. H. Burnside featuring Richard Dix in his first starring role. A wealthy New Yorker falls in love with a burglar's sister.

Plot
As described in a review in a film magazine, Peter Minuit (Dix), wealthy and bored with life, is visited by a burglar who believes him one of his own kind. Peter, posing as Gentleman George, makes a deal with the chap, Spike (Kelly), who hides him in his home where Peter meets and falls in love with his sister Mary (Logan). McGinnis (Siegmann), the head of the gang, wants to marry Mary and she agrees to save her brother and Peter. Peter takes her to his home and reveals his identity. McGinnis threatens to “get” him. Mary goes back to McGinnis. Peter follows and there is a fierce fight. McGinnis is shot by one of his henchmen who has a grudge. The gang is arrested and Peter takes his future wife back home.

Cast

Reception
Mordaunt Hall, critic for The New York Times, gave the movie a mixed review, stating that Kelly's "performance is easily the outstanding one in this production, and singularly enough it is the first time that he has acted before the camera." Hall thought, however, that Dix gave "just another motion-picture performance" and the narrative was "stretched to the breaking point."

Preservation status
A print of the film reportedly survives at Cinemateket Svenska Filminstitutet, Stockholm.

References

External links

 
 
 
 
 Lobby cards and other material at www.richarddix.org

1924 films
1924 romantic comedy films
American black-and-white films
American romantic comedy films
American silent feature films
Films based on British novels
Films set in New York City
Paramount Pictures films
1920s American films
Silent romantic comedy films
Silent American comedy films